The following is a list of notable UK noise musicians and bands.



Hwyl Nofio
Nurse With Wound
Skullflower
Throbbing Gristle
Whitehouse

 
Noise